Established in 2000, Manila Business College is duly accredited by the Commission on Higher Education of the Philippines and the Technical Education and Skills Development Authority (TESDA). It provides an international standard of business education that combines Asian and Western concept of business management and economics studies.

Manila Business College has three semesters a school year and offers business courses such as Business Administration, Entrepreneurship, Information Management, Hospitality Industry Management, Real Estate Management, Accounting Technology and Accountancy. It also offers special language training (ESL, TOEFL, IELTS, Chinese-Mandarin) and college preparatory courses for foreign students. It has formed partnerships with several universities in the Philippines and abroad (including U.S., U.K., China, and Australia) to develop specialized education programs and deliver degree programs in Business and Management.

The College was duly registered by the Securities and Exchange Commission on September 15, 2000 under SEC Reg. No. A200012891.

MBC is located at MBC Building, 1671-1689 Alvarez Street, Sta. Cruz, Manila, Philippines.

History
The Manila Business College Foundation was envisioned by Dr. Thomas Chua. He invited a group of Filipinos to help him organize it. They organized the Board of Trustees with him. Dr. Chua invited Dr. Pedro G. Villaflores, former chief, Higher Education Division of CHED, NCR and retired director of Region IV, Commission on Higher Education, to join the Manila Business College Foundation as its first president.

Accreditation
Manila Business College is duly accredited by:
CHED
TESDA
DepEd
Bureau of Immigration

Undergraduate Studies
College of Business

 Bachelor of Science in Business Administration: The Bachelor of Science in Business Administration (BSBA) program aims to prepare graduates to become competitive managers and business entrepreneurs; assume positions of responsibility in financial institutions and other financing intermediaries; perform functions relating to financial, marketing, management, and other fields in decision-making in enterprises; become effective international and local account executives; and compete in global business management.
 BSBA Major in Banking and Finance
 BSBA Major in Economics
 BSBA Major in Human Resource Development
 BSBA Major in Management
 BSBA Major in Marketing Management
 Bachelor of Science in Accountancy
 Bachelor of Science in Accounting Technology
 Bachelor of Science in Entrepreneurship
 Bachelor of Science in Hospitality Management
 Bachelor of Science in Information Management
 Bachelor of Science in Real Estate Management

Academic partners

Local partners
Cagayan State University
Pangasinan State University
Ramon Magsaysay Technological University
Philippine Christian University
Lyceum of the Philippines University

International partners
Students who wish to pursue a foreign degree will have the opportunity through the Riteway Professional Diploma in Business Administration (PDBA). Students will take a business course for their first year with core business subjects and then continue his or her studies at the partner institution abroad for the remaining years. Below are the partner institutions of the college:
University of Central Lancashire, U.K.
University of Teesside, U.K.
Fort Hays State University, U.S.A.
Central Queensland University, Australia
University of the Sunshine Coast, Australia
University of Southern Queensland, Australia
Edith Cowan University, Australia
University of New England, Australia
Victoria University, Australia
Charles Sturt University, Australia
Swinburne University of Technology, Australia

References

External links
Manila Business College official website

Business schools in the Philippines
Universities and colleges in Manila
Education in Santa Cruz, Manila
2000 establishments in the Philippines